"Jump with Me" is the first single of the Dutch jumpstyle group Sheffield Jumpers, released on 28 August 2008. A music video was also produced for the single, featuring all the jumpers. The track samples the song "Trojan Horse" by Dutch pop trio Luv'. "Jump with Me" was featured as a bonus track on the Jumping All Over the World - Whatever You Want album by Scooter, and a multitude of jumpstyle compilations.

Track listing
CD single

Digital download

External links
Official Website of the Sheffield Jumpers

References

2008 songs
2008 debut singles
Jumpstyle songs
Sheffield Jumpers songs
Songs written by Hans van Hemert
Songs written by Piet Souer